Sergey Polyanskiy (born 29 October 1989) is a Russian athlete who specialises in the long jump. His best result to date is the 8th place at the 2015 World Championships and the fourth place at the 2013 Summer Universiade in Kazan. He also competed at the 2013 World Championships in Moscow without reaching the final.

He has personal bests of 8.16 metres outdoors (2013) and 7.92 metres indoors (2011).

Competition record

References

1989 births
Living people
Russian male long jumpers
World Athletics Championships athletes for Russia
Competitors at the 2009 Summer Universiade
Competitors at the 2013 Summer Universiade